Astramyevo is a village in Zaraysky District, Moscow Oblast, Russia.

References 

Rural localities in Zaraysky District, Moscow Oblast